Gustavo Alfredo Santaolalla (born 19 August 1951) is an Argentine musician, composer, and record producer. He is known for composing his film scores with his collaborator and acclaimed director Alejandro González Iñárritu, which composed the first four psychological drama films Iñárritu directed. He also composed the original scores for the video games The Last of Us (2013) and The Last of Us Part II (2020), as well as the themes for television series such as Jane the Virgin (2014–2019) and Making a Murderer (2015–2018). He won Academy Awards for Best Original Score in two consecutive years, first for Brokeback Mountain (2005) and then Babel (2006).

Early life
Gustavo Alfredo Santaolalla was born in Ciudad Jardín Lomas del Palomar on 19 August 1951.

Career
Santaolalla's music career began in 1967 when he co-founded the group Arco Iris, a rock band that pioneered the fusion of rock and Latin American folk known as rock nacional. The band adopted the lifestyle of a yoga commune guided by former model Danais "Dana" Winnycka and her partner, musician Ara Tokatlian. The band had a few hits, such as "Mañanas Campestres" ("Country Mornings"), and made inroads into different forms of musical expression (notably a ballet piece for Oscar Aráiz). However, Santaolalla felt constricted by the strict requirements of Dana's teachings, which prohibited the consumption of meat, alcohol, and drugs; he left the group in 1975.

In 1976, Santaolalla assembled Soluna, a band in which he played alongside teenage pianist and singer Alejandro Lerner and his then-girlfriend Monica Campins. Together they recorded just one album (Energía Natural in 1977). He then left for Los Angeles, where he adopted a rock and roll sound and formed the band Wet Picnic with ex-Crucis member Aníbal Kerpel. He briefly returned to Argentina in 1981 to produce Leon Gieco's Pensar en Nada and record his first solo album. As a solo artist, he has recorded three albums. His first self-titled album, Santaolalla (1981), broke new ground by incorporating the 1980s sound into rock in Argentina for the first time. He was joined by Lerner and the Willy Iturry-Alfredo Toth rhythm section, who were two-thirds of the band GIT. His second album, titled Gas, was released in 1995.

Santaolalla's most recent solo album, Ronroco (1998), contained several tracks with the characteristic sound of the folk string instrument of the same name, which later became a defining instrument in his soundtrack work. Ronroco also contains his solo piece for Iguazu Falls, which was later used in films such as The Insider,  Collateral and Babel, as well as a 2007 Vodafone TV commercial and TV series such as Deadwood, 24, and Top Gear. It also contains the track "De Ushuaia a La Quiaca" used by Walter Salles in his The Motorcycle Diaries. Santaolalla aided the development of rock en español by acting as producer for the Mexican acts Neón, Maldita Vecindad, Fobia, Molotov, Café Tacuba, and Julieta Venegas; the Colombian singer Juanes; the Chilean rock trio Los Prisioneros; fellow Argentine rock musicians Divididos, Bersuit Vergarabat, Érica García, and León Gieco, among many others.

Santaolalla began working on film soundtracks in the late 1990s, producing albums for the films Amores Perros, 21 Grams, and The Motorcycle Diaries. He provided the instrumental music for the soundtrack to the 2005 film Brokeback Mountain, from which "A Love That Will Never Grow Old" won the 2006 Golden Globe Award for Best Original Song. Santaolalla received the 2006 Academy Award for Original Music Score for Brokeback Mountain. In 2007, he received his second Academy Award for the film score to  Babel, and dedicated the award to his father and his home country Argentina.

Santaolalla acted as the producer of Gaby Kerpel's Carnabailito and co-produced the Kronos Quartet's Nuevo, an album which renders homage to the musical heritage of Mexico. He has also been part of the resurgent neo-tango movement, as the prime mover behind the Bajofondo Tango Club collective. He is mentioned as the co-producer of Calle 13's song "Tango del Pecado", a song from their album Residente o Visitante. In 2005, he received the Platinum Konex Award as best Argentine artistic producer of the 1995-2005 decade. In 2008, he composed the soundtrack for the Louis Vuitton film Where Will Life Take You? directed by Bruno Aveillan. Later that year, he recorded two songs on "All You Need Is Me", a single by English singer Morrissey. The tracks, "Children In Pieces" and "My Dearest Love", were recorded in Los Angeles.

Santaolalla directed music for Aamir Khan's movie Dhobi Ghat, which was released on 21 January 2011. He also collaborated with Argentine composer Osvaldo Golijov on several projects commissioned by soprano Dawn Upshaw. These include the opera Ainadamar, based on the murder of Spanish poet Federico García Lorca, and Ayre, a collection of folk songs, in which Santaolalla plays with a group that calls itself The Andalucian Dogs. He provided the score for the 2012 film On the Road, produced by Francis Ford Coppola and directed by Walter Salles. That same year, he was nominated for Producer of the Year at the Latin Grammy Awards for his work on De Noche (Antonio Carmona), Entre la Ciudad y el Mar (Gustavo Galindo), and Rêverie (Luciano Supervielle), co-produced with Juan Campodónico from Bajofondo.

Santaolalla received critical acclaim for composing the score to the 2013 action-adventure video game The Last of Us, which was his first experience in the video game industry. In 2020, he returned to compose the music for its sequel, The Last of Us Part II.

In 2015, Santaolalla was inducted into the Latin Songwriters Hall of Fame.

On 20 and 21 September 2019, Eric Clapton invited Santaolalla to participate at his Crossroads event at the American Airlines Arena in Dallas, Texas. He performed the song "De Ushuaia a la Quiaca" and a version of "Ando Rodando". He also played in the last song of the event on with Clapton, Gary Clark Jr, Buddy Guy, John Mayer, Susan Tedeschi, Derek Trucks, Jimmie Vaughan, James Bay and others.

Artistry
Santaolalla does not know how to read or write musical notation, nor does he use an orchestra for his soundtracks. He said, "I don't see myself as a film composer. I see myself as more of an artist that uses different forms to express myself. I love it all."

Personal life
Santaolalla lives in Los Angeles with his wife, Alejandra Palacios, and their daughter Luna (born 1994) and son Don Juan Nahuel (born 1999). He has a daughter named Ana (born 1980) from a previous relationship with Monica Campins.

Discography, filmography and video games

Awards and nominations

Awards
Academy Awards:
2005: Best Original Score – Brokeback Mountain
2006: Best Original Score – Babel
Annie Awards:
2022: Best Music, TV/Media - Maya and the Three
BAFTA Awards:
2004: Anthony Asquith Award for Film Music – The Motorcycle Diaries
2006: Anthony Asquith Award for Film Music – Babel
BMI:
On 13 June 2008, Gustavo Santaolalla was honored as a BMI Icon at the 15th annual BMI Latin Awards.  The BMI Icon award is bestowed on creators who have had a "unique and indelible influence on generations of music makers."
Golden Globe Awards:
2005: Best Original Song – "A Love That Will Never Grow Old" from Brokeback Mountain
Grammy Awards:
 2004: Best Latin Rock/Alternative Album – Cuatro Caminos (producer)
 2009: Grammy Award for Best Latin Pop Album: La Vida... Es un Ratico (producer)
Latin Grammy Awards:
2000: Best Rock Album – Revés/Yo Soy (producer)
2001: Best Rock Solo Vocal Album – Fíjate Bien (producer)
2003: Record of the Year – "Es Por Ti" (producer)
2003: Album of the Year – Un Día Normal (producer)
2003: Best Pop Instrumental Album – Bajofondo Tango Club (producer)
2004: Best Alternative Music Album – Cuatro Caminos (producer)
2005: Best Rock Solo Vocal Album – Mi Sangre (producer)
2005: Producer of the Year
 A Contraluz by La Vela Puerca
 Bajofondo Tango Club Presenta A: Supervielle by Supervielle
 Celador De Sueños by Orozco and Barrientos
 Cristobal Repetto by Cristobal Repetto
 Guau! by Arbol
 Mi Sangre by Juanes
 The Motorcycle Diaries: Original Motion Picture Soundtrack
 13 by Javier García
2006: Best Tango Album – Café De Los Maestros (producer)
2008: Record of the Year: "Me Enamora" (producer)
2008: Album of the Year: La Vida... Es un Ratico (producer)
2008: Best Male Pop Vocal Album: La Vida... Es un Ratico (producer)

Nominations
BAFTA Awards:
2005: Anthony Asquith Award for Film Music – Brokeback Mountain
Golden Globe Awards:
2005: Best Original Score – Brokeback Mountain
2006: Best Original Score – Babel
Grammy Awards:
2007: Best Compilation Soundtrack Album for a Motion Picture, Television or Other Visual Media – Brokeback Mountain: Original Motion Picture Soundtrack (producer)
2008: Best Compilation Soundtrack Album for a Motion Picture, Television or Other Visual Media – Babel: Original Motion Picture Soundtrack (composer)
Primetime Emmy Awards:
2012: Primetime Emmy Award for Outstanding Main Title Theme Music – Hell on Wheels

References

External links

 
Interviews at NPR
I've Always Been Obsessed By Identity: An Interview With Gustavo Santoalalla 

Argentine composers
Argentine film score composers
Latin music composers
1951 births
Living people
Male film score composers
Annie Award winners
Animated film score composers
Argentine multi-instrumentalists
Argentine tango musicians
Best Original Music BAFTA Award winners
Best Original Music Score Academy Award winners
Golden Globe Award-winning musicians
Grammy Award winners
Latin Grammy Award for Producer of the Year
Latin Grammy Award winners
Latin music record producers
People from Morón Partido
Rock en Español musicians
20th-century Argentine artists
21st-century Argentine artists
20th-century composers
21st-century composers
20th-century multi-instrumentalists
21st-century multi-instrumentalists
The Plugz members
20th-century male musicians
21st-century male musicians
Varèse Sarabande Records artists
Video game composers
Nonesuch Records artists